Matthew Merrill McMurry (born November 24, 1997) is an American racing driver from Phoenix, Arizona, United States. In 2014 he became the first junior development driver for Dyson Racing and a few months later at the age of 16 years and 202 days old became the youngest driver to participate in and finish the 24 Hours of Le Mans. He is a second generation driver and son of Chris McMurry, LMP2 class winner of the 12 Hours of Sebring in 2005. Matthew is an alumnus of The Henry Samueli School of Engineering at University of California, Irvine.

Career 

McMurry has been racing cars since age 14, competing in Formula Skip Barber, U.S. F2000 Championship, Formula Bondurant, Prototype Lites and the European Le Mans Series. Through age 16 he has total 71 car races with an 8% winning, 21% podium position and 10% fastest lap rate. Prior to racing cars, he raced in karting from age 5-12, mostly locally in Arizona.

24 Hours of Le Mans (2014) 

After back-to-back fourth-place finishes in the 2014 European Le Mans Series at Silverstone and Imola, McMurry was asked to join American Chris Dyson and Englishman Tom Kimber-Smith for the 82nd 24 Hours of Le Mans in the No. 42 LMP2 class entry by Greaves Motorsport from Peterborough, England.

The entry qualified 19th overall and 10th in class. When McMurry was handed the car by Kimber-Smith at about the 43 minute mark in the race, he became the youngest driver to ever participate in the race, breaking the record held by Mexican Ricardo Rodriguez and set 55 years earlier in 1959. Rodriguez was 17 years and 126 days old at the time.

After a 60+ minute pit stop during the 20th hour, the team finished the race 25th overall and 11th in class, having run over 2,600 miles. McMurry broke the record for youngest to finish the race, a mark previously set by American Gunnar Jeannette in 2000 at the age of 18 years and 44 days old.

Racing Record

IMSA Cooper Tires Prototype Lites

24 Hours of Le Mans results

European Le Mans Series

IMSA WeatherTech Sportscar Championship

Asian Le Mans Series

Blancpain GT Series Endurance Cup

References

External links 
 Matt McMurry website

1997 births
Living people
Racing drivers from Phoenix, Arizona
24 Hours of Le Mans drivers
FIA World Endurance Championship drivers
European Le Mans Series drivers
24 Hours of Daytona drivers
WeatherTech SportsCar Championship drivers
U.S. F2000 National Championship drivers
GT World Challenge America drivers
Belardi Auto Racing drivers
Meyer Shank Racing drivers
JDC Motorsports drivers
Greaves Motorsport drivers
Blancpain Endurance Series drivers
Caterham Racing drivers